The Zimbabwe national badminton team represents Zimbabwe in international team competitions and is controlled by the Zimbabwe Badminton Association, the governing body for Zimbabwean badminton. It is affiliated with the Badminton Confederation of Africa (BCA). The national team debuted in the African Badminton Championships in 2014.

History 
The national team was formed in 2008 after the formation of the Zimbabwe Badminton Association. It first competed internationally at the 2014 African Badminton Championships. The team were drawn into Group A with South Africa, Seychelles, Botswana and Cameroon. The team first lost 5-0 to South Africa, then won 3-2 against the Cameroonian team. The team later lost 5-0 to Botswana and Seychelles, thus failing to qualify for the quarter-finals.

Participation in BCA competitions 

Men's team

Women's team

Mixed team

Current squad 
The following players were selected to represent Zimbabwe at the 2022 All Africa Men's and Women's Team Badminton Championships.

Men
Ashel Dziva
Prince Mateme
Thabani Mathe
Dean Matyanga
Tanaka Muvavi

Women
Nyasha Kopolo
Rumbidzai Ruwende
Ashyline Sibiya
Jestina Taruvinga

References 

Badminton
National badminton teams
Badminton in Zimbabwe